Baron Westwood, of Gosforth in the County of Northumberland, is a title in the Peerage of the United Kingdom. It was created in 1944 for the trade unionist William Westwood. He was General Secretary of the Ship Constructors' and Shipwrights' Association (now part of GMB Union) from 1929 to 1945.  the title is held by his great-grandson, the fourth Baron, who succeeded his father in that year.

Barons Westwood (1944)
William Westwood, 1st Baron Westwood (1880–1953)
William Westwood, 2nd Baron Westwood (1907–1991)
William Gavin Westwood, 3rd Baron Westwood (1944–2019)
(William) Fergus Westwood, 4th Baron Westwood (b. 1972)

The heir presumptive is the present holder's younger brother Hon. Alistair Cameron Westwood (b. 1974).

References

Kidd, Charles, Williamson, David (editors). Debrett's Peerage and Baronetage (1990 edition). New York: St Martin's Press, 1990.

Baronies in the Peerage of the United Kingdom
Noble titles created in 1944